Openn is a platform that facilitates real time communication and negotiation in a property transaction. Openn Negotiation combines flexibility of a private treaty with the transparency of auction price discovery. Openn Offers supports a traditional private treaty process with improved transparency. Openn Tender allows buyers to submit tender offers digitally before a set deadline for the agent and seller to review. It was launched in Australia in 2016, and has seen significant growth largely due to COVID-19 restrictions on traditional home inspections and on-site auctions.

Operations 
The Openn platform has been built with the intention to offer multiple sales methods for property transactions. Openn Negotiation is the primary product offering and sales process – it combines the flexibility of a private treaty with the transparency of auction price discovery.

Functionally, the Openn platform provides agents with a tool to facilitate real time communication and negotiation between all stakeholders in a property transaction. The platform provides additional benefits to agents such as digital contracting, data retention and integration to agency customer relationship management (CRM) systems to promote efficient work processes and improved outcomes for their customers.

Openn Negotiation’s online bidding platform is transparent for buyers, sellers and agents.

Since 2017, Openn Negotiation has sold $4.95 billion worth of property in Australia.

Partnerships and integrations 
 August 2021 – CoreLogic onthehouse.com.au
 April 2022 – The Canadian Real Estate Association REALTOR.ca

Awards 
 March 2021 – United States National Association of Realtors REACH Program

Patents 
 Australian Patent – 2017280108
 US Patent – US 11,250,498 B2

See also
 Online auction

References

External links
Openn Negotiation

Real estate
Australian companies established in 2016
Financial services companies established in 2016
Companies based in Western Australia
Software companies of Australia
Development software companies
Australian brands
Companies listed on the Australian Securities Exchange
Financial software companies
Announced information technology acquisitions